Phá lấu is a Vietnamese dish from Ho Chi Minh City, made from pork meat and offal that is braised in a spiced stock of five-spice powder (with curry powder sometimes added). Small wooden sticks are used to pick up the meat, which is then dipped in pepper, lime/kumquat and chili fish sauce and served with rice, noodle or bánh mì. In Cambodia, the dish is called pak lov.

See also
Ngau zap
Lou mei 
Sekba

References

Vietnamese cuisine